Employee relationship management (ERM) is considered to be a specific field of Human Resource Management. ERM is the process of adopting controlling methods and practices to regulate employee relations. One of the main goals associated with employee relationship management focuses on establishing and retaining productive relationships of employees within a company.

A main component of ERM is effective organizational communication. This leads to the increase of employee confidence, trust and loyalty.  By effectively managing relationships, a company can determine whether or not a companies objectives are being met.

Employee relationship management has focused on enabling employees to collaborate on typical managerial tasks with their employers. By engaging inputs from both sides of the employment relationship, ERM platforms aim to align the interests of both parties, worker and employer, and inform day-to-day business functions under a streamlined workflow.

Components and functions
In analyzing the concept of Employee Relationship Management, it is imperative that one understands the multiple components and functions of ERM to build strong employee-company relationships.

These components and functions may include, but are not limited to:

 Job postings (5)
 Interview process (1)
 Candidate selection (5)
 New employee orientation 
 New employee on-boarding programs (5)
 Training and professional development (5)
 Supervision policies and procedures (1)
 Employee assistance programs (5)
 Employee engagement (8)
 Equity, inclusion, and diversity initiatives
 Robust internal and external communication systems 
 Compensation and benefits packages (1)
 Performance management system (8)
 Conflict resolution policies and procedures 
 Employee separation or termination process

After considering these components and functions that are essential to comprehending ERM, one must look at this concept in relation to the employee life cycle.

Developing Solid Employee Relationship Management Systems for On-boarding 
Strong employer-employee relations begin with the marketing of jobs to candidates and the way in which a company discusses what it is like to work for the company. This means that there is not simply a posting of a job description on a job board, but discussion about what the experience of working for the company is like, as well as the type of contributions the company is looking for in their ideal candidate.  Additionally, the ease of applying must be considered for the candidate while ensuring that enough information is being gathered for the employer.

We must then look at the role that technology now plays in building this relationship with candidates and the organization. Based on the size and operating budget for the recruitment process, some companies now utilize artificial intelligence systems to run resumes. As a result, it is crucial that these systems have analytics that properly capture the company’s ideal candidate. Furthermore, the company must balance the value of human contact for candidates to ensure their interest is maintained in the job.

Furthermore, it is valuable to look at how hiring managers are trained in the interview process. They must demonstrate competency about “the legal do’s and don’ts of interviewing,” to protect the company, themselves, and safeguard candidates as well (1). The balance of enough time to select the ideal candidate, while valuing the other side for candidates so that they do not move on to another opportunity must be applied. Procedures for hiring like phone screens, 1st round interviews, 2nd round interviews, and final interviews are considered necessary to communicate not only to managers, but prospective employees too.

Once this selection is made, the orientation component arises and the experience that the new employee will have. The company demands of a new employee acquiring as much knowledge as possible with time constraints in mind, must be well balanced. Many organizations focus on the idea that an employee must walk away with just the idea of “how things are done around here,” (5) but there is increased research that shows the incorporation of “personal-identity socialization” in orientation will lead to stronger employer-employee relations. This active learning experience aligns strongly with Adult Learning Theory for new employees to master job responsibilities. Training and professional development departments must strategically think about training schedules for new employees that engages them to understand the company, while embracing them as individuals. Make sure that employees feel welcomed into the new environment and the on-boarding period allows for relationship building activities throughout the company at the start. Managers must ensure that the resources provided to the new employee, such as a schedule, presentation materials, contact information, electronic accounts information, and a list of frequently asked questions. To continue building a positive experience, the new employee’s office environment should be inviting and well-resourced with materials, ultimately contributing to solid ERM. A mentor, coach, or colleague being assigned to each new employee shows that they have an individual outside of their manager to get them acclimated to the company and answer the wide array of questions. Taking into consideration all these parts of employee on-boarding process will assist in building a robust employer-employee relationship.

With new generations entering the workforce, companies should begin to build on the employee’s strengths to develop stronger ERM, in turn increasing productivity. From there the company can help the employee translate these strengths to their job responsibilities. The idea of building an orientation around an employee’s strengths will empower, engage, and develop a positive employee relationship management(5).

Developing Strong Employee Relationship Management During Employee Tenure 
The Bureau of Labor Statistics released figures stating that “more than 63 million people changed or separated from their jobs in 2017” (Edler 2018). This figure alone demonstrates the need for companies to continue to focus on building their employee relations programs in order to keep their workforce engaged and satisfied. After all, on-boarding a new employee has high operational costs that can be avoided by investing in the ERM to retain employees.

In thinking about strengthening the foundation of the ERM, the Journal of Business offers seven constructs that should be considered to build a firm relationship. This begins with cooperation and the degree the employee feels is a strong sign of the relationship’s strength. The next area is ensuring the feeling of balanced power, followed by strong communication. Fourth is the feeling of attachment and how an employee feels supported in their workplace. subsequently is the idea that the employer and employee have shared goals and values. Finally, there is the idea of trust and the absence of damaging conflict. Considering all these areas of the employer-employee relationship will only strengthen the employee relations bond (8).

One of the most crucial areas to pay attention to the training and professional development program. Employees need to feel that they have opportunities in front of them to increase their own human capital and build a competitive advantage. Employers can foster this through a variety of training programs internally or through external training offerings. This may come in the form of attending a conference, certificate programs, or homing in on employees’ strengths to have them become trainers within the company. Creating robust training programs will assist in building a firm employee relations program (8).

Another area of focus to maintain strong ERM is ensuring the company is offering the best compensation and benefits package on the market. As healthcare costs continue to rise, it is imperative that companies analyze the best coverage they can offer from employees and their families, as well as absorbing as much of the cost themselves that they can afford. This leads into the discussion of the employer contribution to benefits and how this is a key ingredient to high retention of employees. This may come in the form of other offerings like employer contributions to retirement plans, discounted memberships to gyms, tuition remission programs, or other perks programs. Compensation must also be analyzed continuously to retain the best talent and understand whether the employer or employee has the pull in the job market. A comprehensive performance management system company wide with measurable goals and a clear compensation structure will assist in equal opportunity practice.

Next, the company must ensure they have knowledgeable managers and supervision procedures. In doing so, managers should be trained to respond versus react to employees to provide the highest level of support. The company should have a standard supervision offering that meets on a consistent basis formally and training to managers on how to coach on the front line. It is imperative that the employee’s ideal feedback style is considered because there is no one size fits all. In fact, with new generations entering the workforce, evidence shows that they respond better to in the moment constructive feedback (10).

After considering how managers are trained, the company must develop clear procedures on handling conflict to ensure an equal opportunity for all. The procedure for handling grievances should be written in the employee handbook with easy access and simple steps to manage the conflict. A neutral party like human resources should always be involved in any conflict to guarantee fair practice.

Finally, the development of multi-tiered committees is beneficial to enhancing the ERM. One such committee might be an employee appreciation one with members at different levels of the organizational hierarchy. Events should be held on a consistent basis to maintain a high moral, with awards being presented to recognize productivity. These can be held with just employees or with families as well. Equity, Inclusion, and Diversity committees are also very important to have at companies to foster a strong bond between the employer and employee. These two committees are great starting points for any company to increase employee relations, but there are also may other ways to expand to continue to build the relationship.

Taking into consideration all these facets of employee relationship management will guarantee strong relations at any company.

References

5. Bergeron, Peter. “Best Practices for Positive Employee Relations.” Business Source Complete, Apr. 2013.

6. Bergeron, Peter. “Best Practices for Positive Employee Relations--Part 2.” Business Source Complete, May 2013.

7. Busy, N. & Suprawan, L. “Most valuable stakeholders: The impact of employee orientation on corporate financial performance.” Public Relations Review, 2012.

8. 
 
9. Cable, D. M., Gino, F., & Staats, B. R. (2013). Reinventing employee onboarding. MIT Sloan Management Review, 54(3), 23-28.

10. Elder, E. (2018, 05). Embrace the changing tides of HR and the employee relationship economy era. HR Strategy and Planning Excellence Essentials

11. 

12. 

13. Lewis-Fernandez, E. “Seven Key Questions That Can Affect the Outcome of Workplace Negotiations.” Employment Relations Today, Fall 2015.

14. Martin, Carolyn. “GETTING HIGH ON GEN Y: How to Engage the Entitlement Generation.” Career Planning and Adult Development Journal, Fall 2018.

 
Work–life balance
Employee relations
Business software